All American is the third solo album released in 2015 by Backstreet Boys member Nick Carter. The album was released on November 25, 2015, on his own record label, Kaotic, Inc. This is his first solo album since I'm Taking Off, which was released four years earlier.

Background
In January 2015, Carter let fans know he was working on another solo album that would be titled All American. On September 22, 2015, he released the lead single from the album, "I Will Wait" on Vevo, which he said was inspired by Ed Sheeran's songwriting. Carter also has a track featuring Canadian singer Avril Lavigne, titled "Get Over Me". All American was released on November 25, 2015, a day after the Dancing with the Stars finale, where he was one of the four finalists.

Musical style
The musical style of the album combines pop, rock and pop punk, and features some rock music instruments such as drum and rock guitar. The song "Cherry Pie" has the throwback type feel like that of Mark Ronson. Some songs have a guitar sound of pop punk music, such as "19 in 99", "Tijuana", "All American" and "Left for Dead". The songs "Get Over Me", "California", "Second Wind", "Sweet" and "In Over My Head" have more of a dance-pop and teen pop sound. "I Will Wait" is an emotional ballad inspired by Ed Sheeran, with a clear acoustic guitar sound.

Singles
"I Will Wait" is the first single of the album, released on September 12, 2015, on iTunes, and September 22 on Vevo. The song climbed to No. 1 on the Billboard Trending 140 Chart. On September 24, Carter performed the song on the finale of Dancing with the Stars.

On February 3, 2016, "Nothing's Gonna Change My Love for You" was released only in Japan, set as the promotional single and bonus track of the All American Japanese standard edition. Carter duets with Japanese singer Nissy on this song, which was originally recorded by American musician George Benson, with lyrics by Michael Masser and Gerry Goffin. The song entered the Billboard Japan Hot 100 at No. 86. However, it debuted at No. 12 on the Japanese iTunes Weekly Chart.

"19 in 99" was released as the second official international single of the album. Its music video was released on February 5, 2016 on Vevo and YouTube, and was directed by Kevin Estrada. Bandmate A.J. McLean makes a cameo appearance in the video.

Track listing
All songs produced by Dan Muckala.

Charts

Release history
In the US, the physical CDs were only available on his official website. The album is also available digitally on Amazon, iTunes, and Spotify worldwide.

Tour

To support this album, Carter went on a North American tour that began in February 2016. The tour included 18 cities in 30 days. It started in Beverly Hills and ended in Nashville.

Opening act and guests
American singer Riley Biederer was announced to be the opening act of the entire All American Tour. On February 25, which was the second show held in Beverly Hills, bandmate AJ McLean made an appearance and sang a duet with Carter on the song "The Call". Those in the audience included Sharna Burgess, Rochelle McLean, Jeff Timmons and wife Lauren Kitt. American actress Kyla Kenedy attended the Dallas concert on March 4. During the show in New York, Carter brought out a surprise guest, bandmate Brian Littrell for singing two Backstreet Boys songs; "I Want It That Way" and "Show Me the Meaning of Being Lonely".

Setlist
This setlist was received from the February 24, 2016 concert at Ace of Spades, Sacramento. Carter also covered some songs by other artists during concerts, such as "Wonderwall" by Oasis, "Jesse's Girl" by Rick Springfield, "Californication" by Red Hot Chili Peppers, "Free Fallin'" by Tom Petty, "Buddy Holly" by Weezer and "In the Air Tonight" by Phil Collins. During the song "The Call", Carter performed dance moves that he learned from Dancing with the Stars, where he was one of the contestants.

Show intro
"Blow Your Mind"
"I'm Taking Off"
"Horoscope"
"All American" (contains elements of "Jesse's Girl")
"As Long as You Love Me"
"One More Time"
"Just Want You to Know"
Unplugged
"I Want It That Way"
"Show Me the Meaning of Being Lonely"
"Madeleine"
"I Will Wait"
"Shape of My Heart"
"Second Wind"
Full band rock show
"Burning Up"
"Swet"
"Larger than Life"
"The Call"
"Falling Down"(contains elements of "In the Air Tonight")
"19 in 99"
"Get Over Me"
Encore
"Everybody (Backstreet's Back)"
"I Got You"

"Shape of My Heart" was later replaced by "Wonderwall".

Tour dates

References

2015 albums
604 Records albums
Nick Carter (musician) albums